Ruwen Straub (born 8 December 1993) is a German swimmer. He competed in the men's 1500 metre freestyle at the 2019 World Aquatics Championships.

References

1993 births
Living people
German male swimmers
Place of birth missing (living people)
German male freestyle swimmers